The Mitsubishi 4A9 engine is the newest family range of all-alloy inline four-cylinder engines from Mitsubishi Motors, introduced in the 2004 version of their Mitsubishi Colt supermini, and built by DaimlerChrysler-owned MDC Power in Germany (previously a joint venture).

The engine project was begun as a joint effort by Mitsubishi Motors and DaimlerChrysler (DCX), with Mitsubishi handling the development of the engines and MDC Power GmbH, a company previously jointly established by Mitsubishi and DCX, handling production. The 4A9 is Mitsubishi's first four-cylinder engine family to adopt a high-pressure die-cast aluminum block.

All engines developed within this family have aluminum cylinder block and head, four valves per cylinder, double overhead camshaft layouts,  and MIVEC continuous variable valve timing (intake only).

Engine family characteristics
For high output and low fuel consumption, the MIVEC system and other measures (including optimized shaping of the intake and exhaust manifolds and cylinder head) were used to promote intake and exhaust efficiency. Optimally shaped cooling passages in the cylinder head and optimal control of the flow of coolant into the cylinder head help to suppress engine knocking. Comprehensive measures to engine components were taken to minimize friction.

For lightness and compactness; design optimization, material optimization, and component integration were identified as effective means of minimizing weight and bulk, so they were comprehensively effected in combination with each other. With regard to materials, the cylinder block is made of aluminum; the cylinder-head cover and intake manifold are made of plastic; the exhaust manifold has a pipe-based structure and cams driven by a timing chain. Component integration was applied in many areas of the engine. Notably, the functions of engine accessories were integrated into the cylinder block.

Exhaust emissions from the engine are minimized by measures including optimal design of the combustion chambers, optimal control of the intake air motion by means of the cylinder-head ports, employment of the MIVEC system, employment of an ultra-thin cylinder head gasket, and employment of micro-droplet fuel injectors. The vehicle's overall exhaust emissions are further suppressed by location of the exhaust manifold at the rear of the engine. This layout is beneficial since it minimizes the heat capacity of the exhaust system upstream of the catalytic converter and thus, together with combustion control, promotes activation of the catalytic converter.

4A91's DOHC camshafts are driven by a single-stage roller chain of  pitch and  width, instead of the previous 4G15's cogged belt drive. Camshafts act directly on bucket-type tappets. The intake camshaft is fitted with a continuously variable cam-phasing, altering timing up to 50 degrees. Valves are inclined at an included angle of 34 degrees versus the 4G15's wider 45 degrees.

4A90

Specifications
Engine type — DOHC 16v, ECI multiple
Displacement — 
Bore pitch — 
Bore — 
Stroke — 
Compression ratio — 10.5:1
Power —  at 6000 rpm
Torque —  at 4000 rpm

Applications
2004-2012 Mitsubishi Colt
2004–2006 Smart Forfour
2011 Haima 2 
2014 BAIC Up
2016 DFM Joyear X3
Zotye Z200

4A91

Specifications
Engine type — DOHC 16v, ECI multiple
Displacement — 
Bore pitch — 
Bore — 
Stroke — 
Compression ratio — 10.5:1
Power —  at 6000 rpm
Torque —  at 4000 rpm

Applications
2004 Mitsubishi Colt
2007 Mitsubishi Lancer
2004–2006 Smart Forfour
2009–2019 Soueast V3
2010 Brilliance FSV
2011 Haima 2
2012 Senova D20
2013–present Soueast V5
2013–present Zotye Z300
2014 Senova D50
2014–present Zotye SR7
2016–2020 BAIC BJ20
2016–present Ario S300
2016 Brilliance V5
2016 Senova X55
2016 Yema T70 SUV
2017 Soueast DX3
Zotye Z200
2017–present Soueast DX7
2017–present Mitsubishi Xpander
2019–present Nissan Livina

4A92

Specifications
Engine type — DOHC 16v,ECI multiple
Displacement — 
Bore pitch — 
Bore — 
Stroke — 
Compression ratio — 11.0:1
Power —  at 6000 rpm
Torque —  at 4000 rpm

Applications
2010 Mitsubishi ASX (EU)
 2011 Mitsubishi Lancer (EU)
 2013 Mitsubishi Lancer (PH)
 2011 Brilliance H530
 2012 Brilliance V5
 2012 Zotye Z300 (1.5/1.6L)
2017/2018 DFM Joyear X3

See also
 List of Mitsubishi engines

References

External links
 

4A9
Straight-four engines
Gasoline engines by model